

History

City of York Council is the unitary authority for the City of York, Yorkshire. It is responsible for all local government services within the City of York, except for services provided by York's town and parish councils.

City of York Council was formed on 1 April 1996, as a result of local government reform, covering the former areas of:

As a unitary authority, City of York Council also took over the powers of North Yorkshire County Council within the City of York.

Political control
Since the first election to the council in 1973 political control of the council has been held by the following parties:

Non-metropolitan district

Unitary authority

Leadership

The role of Lord Mayor of York is largely ceremonial, and tends to be held by a different person each year. Political leadership is provided instead by the leader of the council. The leaders since 1984 have been:

Non-metropolitan district elections
1973 York City Council election
1976 York City Council election
1979 York City Council election (New ward boundaries)
1980 York City Council election
1982 York City Council election
1983 York City Council election
1984 York City Council election
1986 York City Council election
1987 York City Council election
1988 York City Council election
1990 York City Council election
1991 York City Council election

1992–1994

A local election was held in May 1992 to elect members of York City Council. Fifteen seats, previously contested in 1988, were up for election: eleven were won by the Labour Party, three by the Conservative Party and one by the Liberal Democrats.  The Labour Party retained overall control of the council; the composition of the council after the election was: Labour Party 34 seats, Conservative Party seven seats and Liberal Democrats four seats.

Local election

1994–1995

Local election 

A local election took place in May 1994 to elect members of York City Council. Fifteen seats, previously contested in 1990, were up for election: twelve were won by the Labour Party, two by the Liberal Democrats and one by the Conservative Party.

Unitary authority elections

Summary of local election results

1995–1999

Local election 

Elections to the new City of York unitary authority were held on 4 May 1995. Following the creation of the expanded authority, 22 councillors were returned to parished areas that were part of district council areas previously outside the boundaries of the former York City Council and 31 councillors were returned to the former York City Council wards. All 53 council seats were up for election. Labour won thirty seats, the Liberal Democrats won 18 seats, the Conservatives won three seats and two Independent councillors were also elected. The Labour Party won overall control of the council.

By-elections

1999–2003

Local election

Elections to City of York Council were held on 6 May 1999.  All 53 council seats in the city were up for election and the Labour party kept overall control of the council.

By-elections 

A by-election was held in Bootham Ward following the resignation through ill-health of sitting Labour councillor Ken Cooper. The seat was won by the Liberal Democrat candidate, Kim Tarry.

Labour councillor Peter Dodd resigned his Monk Ward seat in 2000 due to ill health. The seat was won in the by-election by the Liberal Democrat candidate, Nick Blitz.

A by-election was held following the death of Labour councillor Carol Wallace in 2000. David Evans retained the seat for the Labour Party.

2003–2007

Local election

Local elections for City of York Council took place on 1 May 2003. Boundary changes reduced the number of seats from 53 to 47. The Liberal Democrats won 29 seats, Labour won 15 seats, the Green Party won two seats and an independent candidate won one seat. The Liberal Democrats won overall control of the Council.

2007–2011

Local election 

Local elections for City of York Council took place on 3 May 2007. Of the 47 seats contested, the Liberal Democrats won 19 seats, Labour won 18 seats, Conservatives won eight seats and the Green Party won two seats. The Liberal Democrats lose ten seats and overall control of the Council.

By-elections

Following the death of Conservative councillor Bill Bennett in 2007, the Heworth Without seat was won by Liberal Democrat, Nigel Ayre.

Labour councillor Paul Blanchard resigned for personal reasons in 2009. His Heworth seat was retained for Labour by Barbara Boyce.

Labour Councillor Dr. Roger Pierce resigned in 2010 due to ill health. His Hull Road seat was retained for Labour by Mick Hoban.

2011–2015

Local election 

Local elections for City of York Council took place on 5 May 2011. Of the 47 seats contested, Labour won 26 seats, Conservatives won ten seats, the Liberal Democrats won eight seats, the Green Party won two seats and an independent candidate won one seat. The Labour Party gained overall control of the council from no overall control.

By-elections
A by-election was held in October 2014 following the death of Councillor Lynn Jefferies. The seat was won by the Liberal Democrat candidate and former Council Leader Andrew Waller.

2015–2019

Local election 

Local elections for City of York Council took place on 7 May 2015. New ward boundaries came into effect. Of the 47 seats contested, Labour won 15 seats to form the largest group on the Council, Conservatives won 14 seat, the Liberal Democrats won 12 seats, the Green Party won four seats and two independent candidates won seats. Following talks between the political groups after the election, the Conservatives and Liberal Democrats agreed to run the Council as a joint administration.

NB For wards with multiple seats, the total shown is for each party's highest-polling candidate.

By-elections

Labour Councillors Julie Gunnell and David Levene resigned in 2017 for personal reasons, their seats were retained by Labour candidates Jonny Crawshaw and Michael Pavlovic.

Labour councillor and former Lord Mayor Sonja Crisp stepped down in 2018 due to ill health, her seat was retained by Labour candidate Kallum Taylor.

2019-2023

Local election 

Local elections for City of York Council took place on 2 May 2019. Of the 47 seats contested, the Liberal Democrats won 21, Labour won 17, the Green Party won 4, independents won 3, and the Conservatives won 2. Following the election, the Liberal Democrats and Green Party formed a coalition.

References

External links
City of York Council

 
Elections in York
Council elections in North Yorkshire
Unitary authority elections in England